An election for Lord Speaker, the presiding officer of the House of Lords took place on 13 July 2011, with the result announced five days later. Baroness D'Souza, Convenor of the Crossbench Peers, was elected after the 5th stage of counting. She took office on 5 September 2011.

Candidates
On 9 May 2011, Baroness Hayman, who became the first Lord Speaker following her election in 2006, announced that she would not seek election to a second term. A list of six candidates was announced on 27 June 2011:
 Lord Colwyn (Conservative)
 Lord Desai (Labour)
 Baroness D'Souza (Crossbench)
 Lord Goodlad (Conservative)
 Baroness Harris of Richmond (Liberal Democrat)
 Lord Redesdale (Liberal Democrat)

Result

References

2011 elections in the United Kingdom
House of Lords
Lord Speaker elections